Gender Reveal Fire may refer to:
El Dorado Fire, a 2020 wildfire in California
Sawmill Fire (2017), a 2017 wildfire in Arizona